Victor Suthren (born March 2, 1942) is a Canadian writer and novelist with an interest in colonial and maritime history.

Career

Born in Montreal, Suthren was educated at Bishop's University (BA) and Concordia University (MA) before joining the Civil Service, rising to serve as Director General of the Canadian War Museum, Ottawa (1986-1997) before leaving to pursue a writing career. A former university naval reservist, he later was appointed an active Honorary Captain(N) in the Royal Canadian Navy (1997-2014), charged with the promotion of greater public awareness of Canada's early naval heritage. Although an honorary appointee, for this work he received the Canadian Forces Decoration (CD) and the Queen's Diamond Jubilee Medal. He also holds an eagle feather presented to him by the Micmaq Confederacy of Prince Edward Island, Canada. A former member of the Savoy Society of Ottawa (1983-1993) for whom he was a member of the chorus and sang several minor leads in Gilbert and Sullivan light opera, he is a member of the international Captain Cook Society and has been an occasional film adviser and oceanic "tall ship" sailor in the replica of HM Bark "Endeavour" and other ships.

Publications

Paul Gallant series
Set in mid-18th century
 The Black Cockade (1977)
 A King's Ransom (1980)
 In Perilous Seas (1983)

Edward Mainwaring series
Starts in 1739
 Royal Yankee (1987)
 The Golden Galleon (1988)
 Admiral of Fear (1991)
 Captain Monsoon (1993)

Non-fiction
"The Oxford Book of Canadian Military Anecdotes" (1989) 
"Canadian Stories of the Sea" (1993) 
"The War of 1812" (1999)()
"To Go Upon Discovery: James Cook And Canada" (2000)
"The Sea Has No End: The Life of Louis-Antoine de Bougainville" (2004)
"The Island Of Canada" (2009)
"Black Flag of the North: Bartholomew Roberts, King of Atlantic Pirates" (2018)

References

Victor Suthren, "A Museum of Tolerance", Maclean's Magazine, March 17, 2003.

Canadian historical novelists
Nautical historical novelists
Canadian male novelists
20th-century Canadian historians
Writers from Ottawa
Living people
1942 births
Canadian male non-fiction writers
21st-century Canadian historians